William José Bergolla (born February 4, 1983, in Valencia, Carabobo, Venezuela) is a former Major League Baseball second baseman. He bats and throws right-handed.

Bergolla was rated among the best prospects in the Reds organization, according to Baseball America. For three consecutive years (2002–04), Bergolla led all Reds minor leaguers in stolen bases.

In  at Potomac, Bergolla led the High-A Carolina League with 142 hits and ranked among the league leaders in stolen bases (3rd, 52) and runs scored (5th, 77). In the regular season, he had a 10-game hitting streak from May 5–14 (18-for-45, .400) and a season-high 14-game hitting streak from May 20-June 2 (20-for-53, .377).

Bergolla played the  season at Double–A Chattanooga Lookouts. He ranked fourth in the Southern League in stolen bases (36), also led the Lookouts in runs (79), and received his third All-Star berth. Following the season, he played for the Leones del Caracas in the Venezuelan Winter League and hit .281 in 19 games. Before the 2005 season, he was promoted to the Triple–A Louisville Bats of the International League. On August 12, 2006, Bergolla was designated for assignment.

In a five-season minors career, Bergolla hit .289 with 16 home runs, 150 RBI and 143 stolen bases in 443 games.

On November 27, Bergolla signed a minor league contract with the Washington Nationals that included an invitation to spring training. He became a free agent at the end of the season.

See also
 List of Major League Baseball players from Venezuela

References

External links

Venezuelan Professional Baseball League career statistics

1983 births
Billings Mustangs players
Bravos de Margarita players
Chattanooga Lookouts players
Cincinnati Reds players
Columbus Clippers players
Dayton Dragons players
Erie SeaWolves players
Fresno Grizzlies players
Gulf Coast Reds players
Harrisburg Senators players
Lakeland Flying Tigers players
Leones del Caracas players
Living people
Louisville Bats players
Major League Baseball players from Venezuela
Major League Baseball second basemen
Navegantes del Magallanes players
Potomac Cannons players
Sportspeople from Valencia, Venezuela
Venezuelan expatriate baseball players in the United States